Baleysky District is an administrative and municipal district (raion), one of the thirty-one in Zabaykalsky Krai, Russia. It is located in the southern central part of the krai, and borders Nerchinsky District in the north, Shelopuginsky District in the east, Borzinsky District in the south, and with Olovyanninsky District in the west. Its administrative center is the town of Baley. As of the 2010 Census, the total population of the district was 20,500, with the population of Baley accounting for 61.1% of that number.

History
The district was established on February 11, 1935.

References

Notes

Sources

Districts of Zabaykalsky Krai
States and territories established in 1935
